The term Protestant ecclesiology refers to the spectrum of teachings held by the Protestant Reformers concerning the nature and mystery of the invisible church that is known in Protestantism as the Christian Church.

Theology of grace 

Martin Luther argued that because the Catholic church had "lost sight of the doctrine of grace", it had "lost its claim to be considered as the authenthic Christian church"; this argument was open to the counter-criticism from Catholics that he was thus guilty of schism and a Donatist position, and in both cases therefore opposing central teachings of Augustine of Hippo.

Against denominationalism and schism 

Yet Luther, at least as late as 1519, argued against denominationalism and schism, and the Augsburg Confession of 1530 can be interpreted (e.g. by McGrath 1998) as conciliatory (others, e.g. Rasmussen and Thomassen 2007, marshalling evidence, argue that Augsburg was not conciliatory but clearly impossible for the Roman Catholic Church to accept ). "Luther's early views on the nature of the church reflect his emphasis on the Word of God: the Word of God goes forth conquering, and wherever it conquers and gains true obedience to God is the church":

Ecclesia sancta catholica 

"Now, anywhere you hear or see such a word preached, believed, confessed, and acted upon, do not doubt that the true ecclesia sancta catholica, a 'holy Christian people' must be there...." "Luther's understanding of the church is thus functional, rather than historical: what legitimates a church or its office-bearers is not historical continuity with the apostolic church, but theological continuity."

Systematic ecclesiology 

John Calvin is among those working, primarily after Martin Luther, in the second generation of Reformers, to develop a more systematic doctrine of the church (i.e. ecclesiology) in the face of the emerging reality of a split with the Catholic Church, with the failure of the ecumenical Colloquy of Regensburg in 1541, and the Council of Trent's condemnation in 1545 of "the leading ideas of Protestantism". Thus, Calvin's ecclesiology is progressively more systematic.

Emphasis on the Sovereignty of God 

The second edition of Calvin's Institutes of the Christian Religion in 1539 holds that "the marks of the true church [are] that the Word of God should be preached, and that the sacraments be rightly administered". Later, Calvin developed the theory of the fourfold office of pastor, doctor (or teacher), elder, and deacon, possibly owing to the colleagueship with Martin Bucer and his own experience of leadership in church communities.

Visible and invisible church 

Calvin also discusses the visible church and the invisible church; the visible church is the community of Christian believers; the invisible church is the fellowship of saints and the company of the elect; both must be honoured; "there is only one church, a single entity with Jesus Christ as its head" (McGrath); the visible church will include the good and the evil, a teaching found in the patristic tradition of Augustine and rooted in the divine teaching, recorded in the Gospel according to Matthew, of the Parable of the Tares(Mt 13:24-31); thus, Calvin held that it is "not the quality of its members, but the presence of the authorised means of grace, [that] constitutes a true church" (McGrath).

Concerns about fragmentation 

Calvin was concerned to avoid further fragmentation, i.e. splits among the Evangelical churches: "I am saying that we should not desert a church on account of some minor disagreement, if it upholds sound doctrine over the essentials of piety, and maintains the use of the sacraments established by the Lord."

Radical Reformation ecclesiology 

There is no single "Radical Reformation Ecclesiology". A variety of views is expressed among the various "Radical Reformation" participants.

A key "Radical Reformer" was Menno Simons, known as an "Anabaptist". He wrote:

This was in direct contrast to the hierarchical, sacramental ecclesiology that characterized the incumbent Roman Catholic tradition as well as the new Lutheran and other prominent Protestant movements of the Reformation.

Some other Radical Reformation ecclesiology holds that "the true church [is] in heaven, and no institution of any kind on earth merit[s] the name 'church of God.'"

A more conservative analysis of ecclesiology was given in the mid-20th century by the Methodist Robert Newton Flew.

Notes

References

 
 
 
 
 

Ecclesiology
Protestant theology